My Kitchen Rules is a British cooking show that first aired on Sky Living from 23 January to 27 March 2014 and then on Channel 4 from 3 October 2016 to 17 November 2017.

Transmissions

External links

2014 British television series debuts
2017 British television series endings
2010s British cooking television series
2010s British reality television series
British television series based on Australian television series
Channel 4 original programming
English-language television shows
My Kitchen Rules
Sky Living original programming
Television series by Fremantle (company)